Asociación Deportiva Chalatenango is a Salvadoran professional football club based in Chalatenango, El Salvador, they are currently playing in the top-tier Primera División de Fútbol de El Salvador.

The club was founded in 1950 as CD Alacranes, and reformed in 1975, as Club Deportivo Chalatenango.

In 1975, the club relocated to their current stadium, the Estadio José Gregorio Martínez stadium.

They initially competed in the regional and national competition before eventually joining the full Salvadoran Second Division in 1960s, and subsequently enjoyed promotion to the top flight for the 1979 season.

Since its formation in 1950, the club has won three Segunda División Salvadoreño titles (1979, 1990, 2003) and one Tercera División Salvadoreño (2013 Clausura).

Its emblem and mascot is a Scorpion.

History

Early history
In 1977 Gregorio Martínez, started a club naming them Alacranes and purchased the spot of Independiente de San Vicente in the Liga de Ascenso for five Colon. They eventually changed their name to Club Deportivo Chalatenango.

Club Deportivo Chalatenango Success and insolvency (1979–2009)
In 1979, Club Deportivo Chalatenango obtained promotion to the Primera División de Fútbol Profesional and managed to stay there for ten years.

In 1990, CD Chalatenango were relegated to the Segunda División. They stayed in the Segunda División battling promotion for 13 years until they won promotion in 2003, but a year later they were relegated again.

However they were able to quickly return to the Primera División de Fútbol Professional by purchasing the spot of Coca-Cola for $250,000.

In the 2008 Apertura, Chalatenango reached the final for the first time in the club's history under the direction of Carlos Melendez. After a 3–3 draw in normal time, they lost 4–3 on penalties, which allowed Isidro Metapán to become champions for the second time.

The team qualified for the 2009–10 CONCACAF Champions league knockout phase based on their record in apertura and clausura. On 26 June 2009, due to financial trouble, sold their spot in the Primera División de Fútbol Profesional to Municipal Limeño. Because the club failed to fill out the necessary paperwork to compete in the Second Division before the 7/23/09 deadline, CD Chalatenango did not compete during the 2009–10 season.

At the time, the club owed its former players $17,000 in unpaid salaries, and it owed CONCACAF $7,500 for pulling out of the CONCACAF Champions League

Merger Years (2009–2013)
At the end of 2009, some of Chalatenango's former players created a new team, merging it with Nejapa FC to establish Alacranes Del Norte.

In 2010, the club filed the necessary paperwork to be able to compete in the Second Division.

In 2012, The club merged with Vendaval to form Chalatenango-Vendaval and they played in the second division.
However, after one season, in 2013, the partnership between Chalatenango and Vendaval ended and they split into two teams again, with Vendaval remaining in the Second Division while Chalatenango descending down a level to play in the third division.

Rebirth and another bankruptcy (2013–2017)

Chalatenango as a sole entity for the first time in five years, they were able to win promotion to the segunda division via promotion playoff and they continued several attempts to gain promotion to the first division, they were unsuccessful

However, on 18 June 2015 the team purchased a franchise license in the new expansion of the Primera Division and will be able to compete in the Primera Division for the Apertura 2015 season.

Financial troubles precipitated a succession of ownership changes and the club's eventual bankruptcy in June 2017 with total liabilities of €218 thousand dollars and months of unpaid salaries. The club was allowed to finish the season but finished bottom of the league in 12th place. They had License stripped and owner Francisco Perraza were suspended.

Another rebirth (2017–present)
The re-founded club, A.D. Chalatenango, was formed in July 2017, taking its name from the predecessor club and beating off competition from rival clubs to secure a place in the 2017–2018 season as the representative of Chalatenango. Rigoberto Mejia was appointed as president and former coach Ricardo Serrano was chosen as head coach.

Stadium

Chalatenango plays its home games at Estadio José Gregorio Martínez in Chalatenango. The Estadio José Gregorio Martínez is a 15,000-seat soccer-specific stadium.

In 2018, INDES stated that Estadio José Gregorio Martínez will undergo renovations to allow them to satisfy the ability to host CONCACAF matches

Rivalry
Chalatenango's current biggest rivalry was with fellow Chalatenango based team Atlético Comalapa, against whom they contest the derby chalateco.

Another of Chalatenango's rivalry was with fellow Chalatenango based but now defunct team Alacranes Del Norte, against whom they contest the derby chalateco. The rivalry stems from Alacranes Del Norte 's relocation from Nejapa to Chalatenango and using the same colours and stadium as Chalatenango

Sponsorship
Companies that Chalatenango currently has sponsorship deals with for 2021 Apertura include:
 Arijam Sports – Official Kit Suppliers
 Electrolit – Official sponsors
 Powerade – Official sponsors 	
 Canal 4 – Official sponsors
 Aqua Sport – Official sponsors	
 Eurofarma – Official sponsors 
 Omnicom – Official sponsors 
 Fitness Sports – Official sponsors

Honours

Domestic honours

Leagues
 Primera División Salvadorean and predecessors 
  Runners-up (1): Apertura 2008
 Segunda División Salvadorean and predecessors 
 Champions (3) :  1979, 1990, 2003
 Tercera División Salvadorean and predecessors 
 Champions (1) :  2013 Clausura

Club records
 First game in the Primera Division for Chalatenango: 0-1 v Atletico Marte, 6 May 1979 
 First victory in the Primera Division for Chalatenango: 2-1 TBD, TBD, 2019
 First goalscorer for Chalatenango: TBD v TBD, TBD, 2019
 First goalscorer in the Primera Division for Chalatenango: TBD v TBD, TBD, 2019
 Largest Home victory, Primera División: 3-0 v TBD, TBD, 2019
 Largest Away victory, Primera División: 4-0 TBD, TBD, 2019
 Largest Home loss, Primera División:  4-0 v TBD, TBD, 2019
 Largest Away loss, Primera División: 0–3 v TBD, TBD, 2019
 Highest home attendance: 14,403 v Primera División, Estadio Cuscatlán, 21 December 2008
 Highest away attendance: 1,000 v Primera División, San Salvador, 2018
 Highest average attendance, season: 49,176, Primera División
 Most goals scored, Apertura 2019 season, Primera División: 21, TBD, 2018
 Worst season: Primera Division Apertura 2019: 3 win, 5 draws and 14 losses (14 points)

Individual records
 Record appearances (all competitions): TBD, 822 from 1957 to 1975
 Record appearances (Primera Division):  Salvadoran TBD, 27 from 2018
 Most capped player for El Salvador: 74 (7 whilst at Chalatenango), Ramón Sánchez
 Most international caps for El Salvador while a Chalatnenago player: 1, TBD
 Most caps won whilst at Chalatenango: 1, TBD.
 Record scorer in league: TBD, 396
 Most goals in a season (all competitions): TBD, 62 (1927/28) (47 in League, 15 in Cup competitions)
 Most goals in a season (Primera Division):  René Andrés Ubau, 13

Table of top scorers in our history

Most Appearances 

Note: Players in bold text are still active with Chalatenango

Top goalscorers 

<small>Note: Players in bold text are still active with Chalatenango</small>

Current squad:Out on loan

In

	

Out

Players with dual citizenship
   Josué Dubon
   Fernando Estrada
    Matthaus García

Personnel

Coaching staff

Management

Reserve League squad
Chalatenango's reserve squad plays in the twelve-team Primera División Reserves (El Salvador).Updated 7 February 2022''

Presidential history

Coaches

Chalatenango has had 22 permanent managers and two caretaker managers since the club's first appointed Oscar Rene Serrano as a professional manager in 1960.  The longest-serving manager in terms of time was Armando Contreras Palma, who managed Chalatenango for three years from 1986 to 1990. Raúl Héctor Cocherari, who managed the club from 2002 to 2003, was the first Chalatenango manager to achieve a championship.

References

External links
  – Official team page
 Historia – Alacranet 
 Una generación bendecida (Historia) – La Prensa Gráfica 

Association football clubs established in 1950
Chalatenango
1950 establishments in El Salvador
Alacranes